The assassination of Julius Caesar refers to the stabbing attack that killed Roman dictator Julius Caesar in 44 BCE.

Assassination of Caesar or Assassination of Julius Caesar may also refer to:

 Caesars (Roman emperors) who were assassinated, see List of Roman emperors

Assassination of Julius Caesar
The Assassination of Julius Caesar may also refer to:

 The Assassination of Julius Caesar (Sullivan), a painting
 The Assassination of Julius Caesar (album), by Norwegian band Ulver
 The Assassination of Julius Caesar: A People's History of Ancient Rome, a book

Assassination of Caesar
The Assassination of Caesar may also refer to:

 The Assassination of Caesar, a painting by Heinrich Fueger

See also
 Death of Caesar (disambiguation)
 Julius Caesar (disambiguation)
 Caesar (disambiguation)